Tagtraum (Daydream) is a Live CD + DVD release by German electronic musician, composer and producer Christopher von Deylen under his Schiller alias. The CD contains several live recordings of the tracks found on the 2005 Schiller album Tag und Nacht. Recorded during Schillers 2006 'Tag und Nacht' tour.
DVD 1 holds additional music videos for 5 tracks, a documentary about Schiller's gig in Athen (specially invited by Depeche Mode), official music videos for the singles released in connection with the 'Tag und Nacht' album, Making of's and a photo album. The second DVD features an entire live concert - 120 minutes Schiller live in Germany.

Track listing

References

2006 live albums
Live albums by German artists
Universal Records live albums
Island Records live albums
Schiller (band) albums